Hollywood Game Night is an international television game show franchise of American origin, in which contestants take part in a casual game night with celebrities. The original American version debuted on July 11, 2013 on NBC.

International versions

References

Television lists by series
H